Agent Vinod may refer to:

 Agent Vinod (1977 film), a 1977 Hindi action film directed by Deepak Bahry
 Agent Vinod (2012 film), a 2012 Indian action spy film directed by Sriram Raghavan